Charles Rolfe (1890–1965) was a British stage, film and television actor. One of his most notable roles was in the 1941 wartime thriller Tower of Terror.

Selected filmography
 Tower of Terror (1941)
 The Man at the Gate (1941)
 49th Parallel (1941)
 Hard Steel (1942)
 Meet Sexton Blake (1945)
 The Voice Within (1946)
 The Man Within (1947)
 Dear Murderer (1947)
 You Lucky People (1955)

References

Bibliography
 Michael F. Keaney. British Film Noir Guide. McFarland, 2008.

External links

1890 births
1965 deaths
British male stage actors
British male television actors
British male film actors
Male actors from London